The 2012 Courtesy Freight Northern Ontario Superspiel was held from November 9 to 11 at the Port Arthur Curling Club in Thunder Bay, Ontario as part of the 2012–13 World Curling Tour. The event was held in a round robin format. The purse for the men's event was CAD$15,000, of which the winner, Al Hackner, received CAD$5,000, and the purse for the women's event was CAD$6,000. Hackner defeated Craig Kochan in the men's final with a score of 7–5, while Krista McCarville defeated Ashley Kallos in the women's final with a score of 5–2.

Men

Teams
The teams are listed as follows:

Round-robin standings
Final round-robin standings

Playoffs
The playoffs draw is listed as follows:

Women

Teams

The teams are listed as follows:

Round-robin standings
Final round-robin standings

Playoffs
The playoffs draw is listed as follows:

References

External links

2012 in Canadian curling
Sports competitions in Thunder Bay